"Silencio" is the second single to be released from David Bisbal's 2006 studio album, Premonición. "Silencio" tells the story of someone who feels hurt because his lover left him.

In October, the single was started Spanish promotion in TV show with the mobile tune.

Charts

Weekly charts

Year-end charts

Covers
In the summer of 2007, Dutch artist Jeroen van der Boom covered "Silencio" in Dutch, called "Jij bent zo", and hit number 1 with his version in the Dutch top 40.

References

David Bisbal songs
Spanish-language songs
Number-one singles in Spain
2006 songs
Songs written by Kike Santander